Mineri Kurotori Gomez (born April 14, 2001) is a Guamanian swimmer competing in the 100 meter freestyle at the 2020 Summer Olympics. She swam the 100 and 200 meter freestyle at the 2019 World Aquatics Championships and the 100 meter freestyle and 100 meter butterfly at the 2017 World Aquatics Championships.

References

External links
 

Living people
2001 births
Guamanian female butterfly swimmers
Olympic swimmers of Guam
Swimmers at the 2020 Summer Olympics
Guamanian female freestyle swimmers
21st-century American women
Guamanian people of Japanese descent
Guamanian people of Filipino descent